Hit means to strike someone or something.

Hit or HIT may also refer to:

Arts, entertainment and media

Fictional entities
 Hit, a fictional character from Dragon Ball Super
 Homicide International Trust, or HIT, a fictional organization in MacGyver

Film and television
 H.I.T (TV series), a South Korean drama miniseries
 HIT Entertainment, a British-American production company
 Hit!, a 1973 crime film
 TV HIT, a Bosnian television channel
 HIT: The First Case, 2020 Indian Telugu-language crime thriller film by Sailesh Kolanu
 HIT: The First Case (2022 film), 2022 remake of the above in Hindi

Music
 Hit song, a recorded song that becomes popular or commercially successful
 Hit (album), by Peter Gabriel
 "Hit" (The Sugarcubes song), a single by The Sugarcubes from their 1992 album Stick Around for Joy
 "Hit", a song by Guided by Voices from the 1995 album Alien Lanes
 "Hit", a song by The Wannadies from the 1997 album Bagsy Me
 Hit Records (Croatia), a Croatian record label
 Hit Records, a defunct American record company

Radio
 Hit FM (disambiguation)
 Hit Network, an Australian radio network

Brands and enterprises
 Hit (drink), a Venezuelan carbonated soft drink
 Hitachi, Ltd., a Japanese multinational conglomerate
 Hongkong International Terminals Ltd.
 Heavy Industries Taxila, a military complex in Pakistan

Computing
 Hit (internet), a single request for a file from a web server
 an intersection of the cursor and graphic object during hit-testing in computer graphics
 Human Intelligence Task, an Amazon Mechanical Turk task

Education
 Hanze Institute of Technology, in the Netherlands
 Harare Institute of Technology, in Zimbabwe
 Harbin Institute of Technology, in China
 Heritage Institute of Technology, Kolkata, in India
 Holon Institute of Technology, in Israel

Language 
 Hit (pronoun), Old English, third-person singular neuter accusative, "it" in modern English
 Hit, slang for contract killing
 Hittite language

Places
 Hit, Qasr-e Qand, a village in Iran
 Hit, Iraq, a town
 Hit District, a district centered on the town
 Hit, Syria

Science and medicine
 Health information technology
 Heparin-induced thrombocytopenia
 Herd immunity threshold; see herd immunity § Mechanism
 Hibernation induction trigger

Sports
 Hit (baseball) or base hit
 High intensity training
 The Hit (Chuck Bednarik), a November 20, 1960, tackle by Chuck Bednarik of the Philadelphia Eagles on Frank Gifford of the New York Giants

See also
 Hits (disambiguation)
 The Hit (disambiguation)